Nagaur is a major railway station in Jodhpur Mandal  (Rajasthan, India). Its code is NGO. The district headquarters station Nagaur consists of three platforms. Platforms 2 and 3 are not well sheltered. At present more than 47 trains halt at this station. It is A grade station based on revenue and public footfalls. There is high demand that some luxury trains like Humsafar Express should make stops at this station. Geographically, Nagaur railway station is a central station of Rajasthan and caters to a massive number of travellers.  The station lacks many amenities like air-conditioned waiting rooms, restaurant, extra roof-top shelter, solar-based energy system, automatic escalator, digital / analog clocks (platform 2,3) and digital information board (platform 2,3).

Station category: A grade station.

References

Railway stations in Nagaur district
Jodhpur railway division